Phegaea or Phegaia was a deme of ancient Attica in the phyle of Pandionis. 

Its location is unknown, although some conjecture a site near Oropia.

References

Populated places in ancient Attica
Former populated places in Greece
Demoi
Lost ancient cities and towns